Volimes, is a village and a community in the mountainous northwestern part of the island of Zakynthos. It was the seat of the municipality of Elatia. In 2011 its population was 406 for the village, and 571 for the community, which includes the villages Agios Nikolaos (pop. 30), Askos (pop. 31), Varvara (pop. 30), Elies (pop. 26), Korithi (pop. 48) and the uninhabited islet Agios Andreas. Volimes is located 1 km west of Ano Volimes, 3 km north of Anafonitria and 23 km northwest of Zakynthos (city). It is close to the Ionian Sea coast, and 7 km southwest of the island's northernmost point Cape Skinari. The village suffered great damage from the 1953 Ionian earthquake.

Population

See also
List of settlements in Zakynthos

References

External links
Volimes at the GTP Travel Pages

Populated places in Zakynthos